E-International Relations (E-IR) is an open-access website covering international relations and international politics. It provides an academic perspective on global events. Its editor-in-chief is Stephen McGlinchey. The website has published since November 2007, and was incorporated as a non-profit organisation in 2011. It is listed under "sites of related interest" by the London School of Economics and is recommended by leading professors and diplomats. Its articles have been cited by The Wall Street Journal'''s blog, the Brookings Institution, the Stanley Foundation, and The Daily Beast. It is indexed by the Human Security Gateway.E-IR'' contains a mixture of open access books, articles, essays, and features, broadly aimed at students and scholars of international politics. Prominent contributors have included Ted Robert Gurr, Harsh V. Pant, Charles J. Dunlap, Jr., Rohan Gunaratna, Anand Menon, Barry Rubin, I. William Zartman, Immanuel Wallerstein, Jolyon Howorth, John Redwood, Brian Barder, Roie Yellinek and Stephen Chan.

The site also runs a student essay award, and has ventured into publishing free textbooks for students.

References

External links
 
 Profile of e-IR by Intute

Online magazines published in the United Kingdom
International political websites
Magazines established in 2007
Open access publications
Political magazines published in the United Kingdom
British political websites